Hilaire Hurteau (May 4, 1837 – February 10, 1920) was a notary and political figure in Quebec. He represented L'Assomption in the House of Commons of Canada from 1874 to 1887 as a Liberal-Conservative member.

He was born in Contrecoeur, Lower Canada and educated at L'Assomption College. He studied law with notary Isidore Hurteau in Longueuil, later qualifying to practice as a notary. In 1859, he married Delphine Beaudoin. Hurteau served three years as mayor of St-Lin and three years as warden for the county. He also served as secretary-treasurer of schools. Hurteau was vice-president of the Laurentian Railway Company. His election in 1874 was overturned after an appeal but he won the subsequent by-election in 1875 by acclamation.

electoral record 

By-election: On Mr. Hurteau being unseated on petition, 24 November 1874

References 
 
The Canadian parliamentary companion and annual register, 1878 CH Mackintosh

1837 births
1920 deaths
Members of the House of Commons of Canada from Quebec
Conservative Party of Canada (1867–1942) MPs